Hadim Mesih Pasha (died 1589) was an Ottoman statesman who served as Grand Vizier under Murad III from 1 December 1585 until 15 April 1586.

Masih Pasha was born in Bosnia to a Christian family. As a eunuch he served as chief of the inner pantry and treasury of the imperial palace. In 1574 he was sent to Cairo as governor-general of Egypt. On his return to the capital in 1581 he became the third vizier. He was promoted to second vizier in July 1584 and in November 1585 he substituted for Özdemiroğlu Osman Pasha when Osman Pasha left the capital on a campaign against the Safavids. On Osman Pasha's death Masih Pasha was appointed as Grand Vizier on 1 December 1585, a post he only held until 15 April 1586. He died in 1589 and was buried in a tomb next to the mosque that he had commissioned in Istanbul.

See also
 List of Ottoman Grand Viziers
 List of Ottoman governors of Egypt

References

Sources

16th-century Grand Viziers of the Ottoman Empire
16th-century Ottoman governors of Egypt
Devshirme
Ottoman governors of Egypt
Eunuchs from the Ottoman Empire
1589 deaths